Super Pinball: Behind the Mask  is a pinball simulator for the Super Nintendo Entertainment System that was released in 1994 in North America and Japan.

Summary
Super Pinball: Behind the Mask features three tables: the clown-themed "Jolly Joker", the pirate-themed "Blackbeard and Ironmen", and the fantasy-themed "Wizard." All tables are shown in a tilted 3D view, which fits the entire table on the screen without the need for scrolling, with marquee messages and bonuses displayed as giant overlays on the screen. The game can be played with one to four players. The game uses 3D graphics.

Reception

GamePro criticized the game for emulating early pinball machines, which were "straightforward and not very imaginative", rather than modern pinball video games. They elaborated that "The bumpers, flippers, and bonus markers are too small, and the angle of the board will give you a permanent squint." Electronic Gaming Monthly gave it a 6.4 out of 10, remarking that it "is probably the best looking home pinball game out there, but that's about it. The game play gets very repetitious and boring ..."

References

1994 video games
KAZe games
Meldac games
Pinball video games
Super Nintendo Entertainment System games
Super Nintendo Entertainment System-only games
Multiplayer and single-player video games
Video games developed in Japan